Daredevils of the Red Circle (1939) is a 12-chapter Republic Movie Serial starring Charles Quigley, David Sharpe, Herman Brix (better known under his subsequent stage name, Bruce Bennett), Carole Landis, Miles Mander (in a dual role) and Charles Middleton.  It was directed by William Witney and John English and is considered one of the better serials produced by Republic.  The serial was the fourteenth of the sixty-six serials produced by the studio.

Plot
An escaped criminal, known as Harry Crowl, but preferring to be called by his prison number 39013 (pronounced Thirty Nine - Oh - Thirteen), seeks revenge on the man who sent him to prison, millionaire philanthropist Horace Granville. He kidnaps Granville, imprisoning him within his own house, and disguises himself to take Granville's place, as the frail old man in a clean room, necessary for his health, with the only other person allowed past the glass barrier being his doctor. He then sets about methodically destroying everything Granville owns. When we enter the film, he has already destroyed a number of Granville properties, and has set his sights on the Granville Amusement Centre, at which a trio of acrobats is performing. The daredevils, Gene, Bert, and Tiny escape but Gene's kid brother is badly wounded in the blaze, and later dies of his injuries. Seeking revenge, they take jobs as private investigators for the man they believe to be Horace Granville. Through a series of deadly traps, and with the help of a mysterious cloaked figure, known only as "The Red Circle", the daredevils begin to unravel the truth.

In the first chapter, we are introduced to all the above facts, and even shown the secret room within the Granville estates where 39013 is keeping the real Granville. He is kept in a cell, the exact duplicate of the one in which 39013 resided for his abruptly ended sentence. This room is trapped, so that in the event that 39013 does not return, a dripping reservoir will run dry. The loss of weight will tip the scale, causing deadly gas capsules to break upon the floor, killing Granville in a very short time. This causes him to spout the characteristic line, "You best hope I continue to live, Granville."

Cast

Main cast
 Charles Quigley as Gene Townley, high diver, one of the Daredevils of the Red Circle
 Herman Brix as Tiny Dawson, strongman, one of the Daredevils of the Red Circle
 David Sharpe as Bert Knowles, escape artist, one of the Daredevils of the Red Circle
 Carole Landis as Blanche Granville, Granddaughter of Horace Granville
 Miles Mander as Horace Granville, millionaire philanthropist victim and ex-partner of 39013, and also as 39013 when he is impersonating Granville
 Charles Middleton as Harry Crowel/39013, escaped criminal with a vendetta against Horace Granville

Supporting cast
 C. Montague Shaw as Malcolm, Horace Granville's doctor
 Ben Taggart as Dixon, Horace Granville's manager
 William Pagan as Landon, police chief
 Corbet Morris as Klein, one of 39013's henchmen
 Raymond Bailey as Stanley, Horace Granville's secretary and one of 39013's henchmen
 Snowflake as Snowflake, black comic-relief servant of Horace Granville
 George Chesebro as Sheffield, one of 39013's henchmen
 Ray Miller as Jeff, Horace Granville's nurse
 Robert Winkler as Sammy Townley, Gene's younger brother
 Stanley Price as Prof. Selden (uncredited)
 "Tuffie", the dog

Production
Daredevils of the Red Circle was budgeted at $126,855 although the final negative cost was $126,118 (a $737, or 0.6%, under spend).  It was the cheapest Republic serial of 1939 and one of only three pre-war serials to be made under budget.  The other two were The Fighting Devil Dogs (1938) and Mysterious Doctor Satan (1940).

It was filmed between 28 March and 28 April 1939. The serial's production number was 897.

Ironically, David Sharpe, who is generally considered to have been one of the greatest stuntmen in the movies, had to be doubled in action scenes by Jimmy Fawcett because he was playing a leading role, and the studio could not risk any production delays were Sharpe to suffer injury.

Release

Theatrical
Daredevils of the Red Circle'''s official release date is 10 June 1939, although this is actually the date the sixth chapter was made available to film exchanges.

Television
In the early 1950s, Daredevils of the Red Circle was one of fourteen Republic serials edited into a television series.  It was broadcast in six 26½-minute episodes.

Chapter titles
The Monstrous Plot (27 min 48s)The Mysterious Friend (16 min 41s)The Executioner (16 min 45s)Sabotage (16 min 38s)The Ray of Death (16 min 39s)Thirty Seconds to Live (16 min 39s)The Flooded Mine (16 min 42s)S.O.S. (16 min 40s)Ladder of Peril (16 min 39s)The Infernal Machine (16 min 36s)The Red Circle Speaks (16 min 39s) -- Re-Cap Chapter
Flight to Doom (16 min 40s)Source:Note: This was one of two 12-chapter serials released by Republic in 1939. The other was Zorro's Fighting Legion. Republic also released two 15-chapter serials in this year.''

See also
 List of film serials by year
 List of film serials by studio

References

External links
 
 

1939 films
1930s English-language films
1930s adventure films
American black-and-white films
Republic Pictures film serials
Films directed by William Witney
Films directed by John English
Films scored by William Lava
American adventure films
1930s American films